Nicholas Osorio (born January 20, 1998) is a Canadian professional soccer player who currently plays as a midfielder for Alliance United in League1 Ontario. His brother Jonathan plays for Toronto FC.

Playing career 
Having grown up in Brampton, Ontario, Osorio began playing football Brampton Youth SC at the age of four. He joined the Toronto FC Academy U15 team in 2012, and after progressing through the system, he was called up to the Toronto FC II squad, the feeder team to the MLS outfit, in 2015.

Osorio made his professional debut on July 19, 2015, playing in a 1–0 defeat to Saint Louis in the USL. His second appearance came three days later in a 1–0 defeat to FC Montreal.

He began attending the University of Toronto in 2017, joining the Varsity Blues soccer team. In 2017, he appeared in eight regular season matches, scoring one goal against Nipissing, and appeared in one playoff match.  In 2018, he appeared in 13 regular season matches, scoring twice, as well as two playoff matches. In 2019, he appeared in 11 regular season matches and four playoff games, scoring four regular season goals and one playoff goal. The 2020 season was cancelled due to the COVID-19 pandemic.

In 2018 and 2019, he played for Alliance United in the semi-professional League1 Ontario.

International career 
Osorio selected for two Canada Under-15 camps back in 2013 under the guidance of Tony Fonseca and Ante Jazic. He went with the U15 national team to Mexico for the 2013 Copa de México de Naciones,.

Personal life 
Osorio's parents are Colombian – his father is a native of Cali, while his mother was born in Medellín. His older brothers, Jonathan and Anthony, have played for Toronto FC and Toronto FC II respectively.

Career statistics

References 

1998 births
Living people
Alliance United FC players
Association football midfielders
Canadian people of Colombian descent
Canadian soccer players
League1 Ontario players
Soccer players from Brampton
Soccer players from Toronto
Toronto FC II players
Toronto Varsity Blues soccer players
USL Championship players